Grand Marshal of Peru, commonly referred as Marshal of Peru, is the highest rank in the Peruvian Army. Unlike the other ranks, it is conferred only to an officer who has been victorious at war.

List of Marshals of Peru 

1821 -  

1823 - José Mariano de la Riva Agüero y Sánchez Boquete
Antonio José de Sucre y Alcalá
Mariano Necochea
José de la Mar

1828 - Agustín Gamarra Messia

1834 - William Miller
Bernardo O'Higgins Riquelme
Domingo Nieto
Ramón Castilla y Marquesado
Miguel de San Román Meza

1919 - Andrés Avelino Cáceres Dorregaray

1939 - Oscar R. Benavides Larrea

1946 - Eloy G. Ureta

1967 - Miguel Grau Seminario (posthumous) 

1989 - Francisco Bolognesi Cervantes (posthumous)

1991 - Jose Abelardo Quiñones (posthumous)

See also
Military ranks of Peru

References

Peruvian Army
Marshals